Shinobi III: Return of the Ninja Master, released in Japan as  is a 1993 hack-and-slash platform game developed and published by Sega for the Mega Drive/Genesis. It is the direct sequel to the previous The Revenge of Shinobi. The game was intended to be released in 1992 and to be very different from the final version of the game in terms of levels and storyline.

Shinobi III is included on the Sega Genesis Collection for the PlayStation 2 and PlayStation Portable and Sonic's Ultimate Genesis Collection for the Xbox 360 and PlayStation 3. It was also released for the Wii's Virtual Console service in 2007, for the PC on the download service Steam in 2010, on the iPhone in 2011, for the Nintendo 3DS eShop in 2013, and on the Nintendo Switch Online + Expansion Pack in 2021.The game also appears on the Sega Genesis Classics (released as Sega Mega Drive Classics in PAL regions) for Windows, Linux, macOS, PlayStation 4, Xbox One and Nintendo Switch

Gameplay
Compared to its predecessor, the action is considerably smoother, with less emphasis on difficulty and more on speed. In addition to the ability to run from place to place, the player character comes equipped with a new array of moves and techniques, including a mid-air dashkick, the ability to jump-scale walls and a powerful running slash that renders him temporarily invincible to projectiles.

Besides his regular assortment of moves and attacks, the player has the ability to perform four special ninjitsu techniques. Only one can be used in each level, unless the Shinobi finds additional ninjitsu bonuses throughout hidden spots in most levels. The four ninjitsu techniques involve engulfing lightning as a temporary shield, summon fire-dragons, boosting his vertical leap and self-sacrificing, the latter costing one life to destroy common enemies or damage bosses.

Plot
Neo Zeed is threatening the world once more. The evil crime syndicate - thought to have been vanquished two years earlier - has returned, headed by a man known only as the Shadow Master. Joe Musashi has felt their presence, and descends from the lonely mountaintops of Japan to face his nemesis once more.

Development

Shinobi III was originally set to be released in 1992. Several gaming magazines (including GamePro, Mean Machines SEGA and Computer & Video Games) gave previews and even reviews of the game, showing pictures of levels, enemies, artwork and special moves which were not seen in the final version at all. Because of being dissatisfied with the result, Sega had put the game back into development to heavily improve it and delayed its release until 1993. When Shinobi III was finally released, many game features seen earlier were missing, with new ones taking their place. A beta-version of the original version of the game has been leaked and is now widely available as a ROM image.

Reception

Shinobi III: Return of the Ninja Master received critical acclaim. MegaTech magazine praised the game's new attacks and moves, but criticised that it was "not as hard as The Revenge of Shinobi". Mega said that "beyond the tricky bosses, this is far too easy". An IGN review by Levi Buchanan called it "a legit Genesis great, one of the better action games for the 16-bit console of yesteryear", even if the iPhone version was deemed just "okay".

Complex rated it the third best game on the Sega Genesis, stating: "The only drawback? The last level was freaking impossible!" Retro Gamer included it among their top ten Mega Drive games.

Notes

References

External links

 

Hardcore Gaming 101: Shinobi
Shinobi III: Return of the Ninja Master can be played for free in the browser on the Internet Archive

1993 video games
Action video games
IOS games
Nintendo 3DS eShop games
Nintendo Switch Online games
Overworks games
Science fantasy video games
Side-scrolling video games
Single-player video games
Sega video games
Sega Genesis games
Shinobi (series)
Video game sequels
Video games developed in Japan
Video games set in Japan
Virtual Console games
Windows games